A concert titled KSL Live World hosted by the visual novel development brand Key under VisualArt's was held in 2008 and again in 2010. The first one, called KSL Live World 2008: Way to the Little Busters! EX, was held on May 10, 2008 in Tokyo, Japan, and again on May 17, 2008 in Osaka, Japan as a part of Key's ten-year anniversary commemoration. The concert featured songs by Lia, Rita, Chata, and Tomoe Tamiyasu who have previously sung songs for singles and albums released under Key's record label Key Sounds Label (KSL). Another concert called KSL Live World 2010: Way to the Kud-Wafter was held in Tokyo on May 21, 2010 and again twice more on May 22, 2010. The concert featured songs sung by Keiko Suzuki, Miyako Suzuta, Aoi Tada, Tomoe Tamiyasu, Chata, Marina, Lia, LiSA, Rita and Riya of Eufonius; however, Riya only appeared at the May 22 concerts.

Three albums were released which consists of two live albums and twos remix album. The first live album was released in December 2008 containing the recording of the May 17, 2008 concert. The second live album was released in December 2010 containing recordings from one of the May 22, 2010 concerts. The first remix album featured remixes of the opening theme "Last regrets" from Key's debut visual novel Kanon and was released at 2008 concerts. The second remix album, released at the 2010 concerts, featured remixes of songs from Clannad, Little Busters! and Kud Wafter. The albums are produced under the record label Key Sounds Label, a division of VisualArt's.

Albums
KSL Live World 2008: Pamphlet and Memorial DiscKSL Live World 2008: Pamphlet and Memorial Disc is a remix album released on May 10, 2008 in Japan by Key Sounds Label bearing the catalog numbers KSLC-0001—0002. The album was first released at the Tokyo, Japan showing of Key's tenth anniversary commemoration concert KSL Live World 2008: Way to the Little Busters! EX. The album was also sold at the Osaka, Japan showing of the concert on May 17, 2008. The album contains two CDs in LP-sized packaging, respectively titled A-side and B-side. The A-side contains six remixes of the opening theme of Key's debut visual novel Kanon, "Last regrets", sung by three different artists; Eiko Shimamiya sings the third track, Lia sings the fifth, and Ayana sings the remaining four songs.

Three of the tracks were previously featured on other singles and albums released by Key Sounds Label and I've Sound. The second track originally appeared on "Last regrets / Kaze no Tadoritsuku Basho" (2006) by Key Sounds Label, the third track came from I've Sound's compilation album Regret (1999), and the fifth track appeared on Recollections (2001) by Key Sounds Label. The song "Last regrets" was originally written and composed by Jun Maeda of Key, and sung by Ayana. The B-side contains a two-part recording of a group talk of the live performers from the concert. The cover art features the heroines Rin Natsume and Komari Kamikita from Key's visual novel Little Busters!.

KSL Live World 2008: Way to the Little Busters! EXKSL Live World 2008: Way to the Little Busters! EX is a live album released on December 28, 2008 at Comiket 75 in Japan by Key Sounds Label bearing the catalog numbers KSLA-0045—0046. The album is the recording of the second KSL Live World 2008 concert held in Osaka, Japan in May 2008, and includes the talks from the MCs in addition to the live music. The album contains two discs with twenty music tracks and eleven MC tracks. Four singers sang at the concert: Chata, Lia, Rita, and Tomoe Tamiyasu. The album is composed, arranged, and produced by Jun Maeda and Shinji Orito, among several others. The musicians at the concert were Hikari Syuyo (guitar), Fire Kawahara (side guitar), UDN (bass), Kenji Maeda (drum), and Katsutoshi (keyboard). Music from five of Key's visual novels were performed: one from Kanon, two from Air, six from Clannad, three from Tomoyo After: It's a Wonderful Life, and five from Little Busters!. Two of the songs were from Lia's singles "Birthday Song,Requiem" and "Spica/Hanabi/Moon".

KSL Live World 2010: Pamphlet Music DiscKSL Live World 2010: Pamphlet Music Disc is a remix album released on May 21, 2010 in Japan by Key Sounds Label bearing the catalog number KSLC-0008. The album was first released at the showings of the KSL Live World 2010: Way to the Kud-Wafter concerts. The album contains one disc with six tracks remixing music from Clannad, Little Busters!, and Kud Wafter. The original versions of these songs were played live at the concerts. The album is composed, arranged, and produced by Jun Maeda, Shinji Orito, and Jun'ichi Shimizu. Singers on the album include: Chata, Lia, Rita, Riya, Keiko Suzuki, and Miyako Suzuta.

KSL Live World 2010: Way to the Kud WafterKSL Live World 2010: Way to the Kud Wafter is a live album released on December 24, 2010 in Japan by Key Sounds Label bearing the catalog numbers KSLA-0061—0063. The album contains recordings from one of the May 22 KSL Live World 2010 concerts, and includes the talks from the MCs in addition to the live music. The album contains three discs with 27 music tracks and 14 MC tracks. Ten singers sang at the concert: Keiko Suzuki, Miyako Suzuta, Aoi Tada, Tomoe Tamiyasu, Chata, Marina, Lia, LiSA, Rita and Eufonius; however, Eufonius only appeared at the May 22 concerts. The album is composed, arranged, and produced by Jun Maeda and Shinji Orito, among several others. Music from five of Key's visual novels, as well as the Angel Beats! anime, were performed. Two of the songs were from Lia's singles "Birthday Song,Requiem" and "Spica/Hanabi/Moon", and one ("Karma") is from Lia's album Dearly''.

References

External links
Key Sounds Label's official website 

2008 live albums
2008 remix albums
Discographies of Japanese artists
Key Sounds Label